The Western Indoor Soccer League (WISL) is an American semi-professional indoor soccer league. It was formed on June 20, 2014 by a group of arena/team owners in the Pacific Northwest. The WISL began its first season on November 15, 2014 with five teams.

Many of the founding clubs previously competed in the Premier Arena Soccer League.

Teams

Former member clubs 
 Arlington Aviators
 Sporting Everett FC
 Vancouver Victory FC
 Wenatchee Fire

Champions

Management 
Co-Founder: John Crouch

External links

References

 
Indoor soccer leagues in the United States
Sports leagues established in 2014
2014 establishments in Washington (state)
Professional sports leagues in the United States